Andrew White (September 6, 1942 – November 11, 2020) was an American jazz and R&B multi-instrumentalist (saxophone, oboe and bass guitar), musicologist and publisher.

Biography
White was born in Washington, D.C., and raised in Nashville, Tennessee, completing his public school education there. He returned to Washington, D.C., in September 1960 to attend Howard University. He graduated in June 1964, cum laude, with a Bachelor of Music degree, majoring in music theory, and with a minor in oboe. After his four years at Howard University, he attended the Paris Conservatory of Music, in Paris, France, on a John Hay Whitney Foundation Fellowship for continued study of the oboe.

As a saxophonist, White appeared on the jazz scene in September 1960, concurrent with his graduation from his studies at Howard University, when he appeared with Washington D.C.'s J.F.K. Quintet (1961–63) which recorded two albums for the Riverside label. He later appeared with Kenny Clarke (1965), Otis Redding (1967), McCoy Tyner (1970), Elvin Jones (1980–81), Beaver Harris (1983), The Julius Hemphill Saxophone Sextet (1987), 'The Six Winds' a Dutch saxophone sextet (1999), and on his own Andrew White's ZORROSAX ALLSTARS, saxophone sextet (2002), and hundreds of personal solo appearances worldwide. These include solo performances at New York City’s Carnegie Hall (1974 and 1975), Lincoln Center (1990 and 1995), Town Hall (1975), The Kennedy Center, in Washington, D.C. (1970 through 2005), Paris, France’s Theatre du Chatelet (1980), La Vila (1995), and a 1994 solo tour of seven French cities.

As composer, publisher, conductor and saxophone soloist, White was presented at the Mass Double Reed Orchestra of 300 Double Reed Instruments at the 32nd Annual Convention of the International Double Reed Society, in June 2003, at the University of North Carolina, at Greensboro, North Carolina.

The ten-year career of White as oboist also included study at Tanglewood, Massachusetts, in the summers of 1963 and 1966, The Dartmouth Community Orchestra, at Dartmouth College, study and performance of contemporary music at The Center Of Creative And Performing Arts, at the State University of New York, at Buffalo, on two Rockefeller Foundation Fellowships, 1965–1967, and his final position as principal oboist with the American Ballet Theatre, from January 1968 through August 1970.

As an electric bassist, White's most viable career spanned the decade 1966-1976. He was primarily the electric bassist with the singer-songwriter Stevie Wonder, from 1968 through August 1970, concurrent with his position as oboist with the American Ballet Theatre Orchestra. He was the principal electric bassist with the popular singing group The 5th Dimension, from 1970 through 1976. Among his most memorable recordings as an electric bassist is with Weather Report's album, Sweetnighter, recorded in January 1973, on Columbia Records.

On May 14, 2006, White was the 2006 Gold Medal Honoree of the French Society of Arts, Sciences, and Letters, in Paris. He shares the award with past honorees including violinist-conductor Lord Yehudi Menuhin, trumpeter, Maurice André, composer Olivier Messiaen, and scientist-Nobel Prize laureate, Albert Schweitzer. White was the only American to receive this award for the year 2006.

Academic
As a musicologist, White published many musicological offerings through his music publishing firm, Andrew’s Music, including The Works of John Coltrane, Vols. 1 though 14: 701 transcriptions of John Coltrane’s Improvisations. Andrew White "thoroughly and meticulously transcribed, encyclopeiasized, catalogued, documented, and self-published the most significant linguistic contributor to the jazz language in the history of jazz, John Coltrane," wrote Peter Occiogrosso, in The Soho News, New York (May 15, 1975). White's book on the music of John Coltrane, Trane and Me (1981), was also published in this manner.

On November 15, 2007, White was honored as a saxophonist by Howard University with the Benny Golson Master Award. He was presented in ceremony and concert, featuring the Howard University Jazz Ensemble (Fred Irby, Director), at Howard University’s Andrew Rankin Chapel.

Death 
White died on November 11, 2020 at an assisted-living facility in Silver Spring, Maryland.

Discography

As leader
 Who Got de Funk? (Andrew's Music, 1973)
 Live in Bucharest (Andrews, 1973)
 Andrew Nathaniel White III (Andrew's, 1973)
 Live at the New Thing in Washington D.C. (Andrew's, 1973)
 Passion Flower (Andrew's, 1974)
 Songs for a French Lady (Andrew's, 1974)
 Theme (Andrew's, 1974)
 Live at the Foolery in Washington D.C. Vol. One (Andrew's, 1975)
 Live at the Foolery in Washington D.C. Vol. Two (Andrew's, 1975)
 Live at the Foolery in Washington D.C. Vol. Three (Andrew's, 1975)
 Live at the Foolery in Washington D.C. Vol. Four (Andrew's, 1975)
 Live at the Foolery in Washington D.C. Vol. Five (Andrew's, 1975)
 Live at the Foolery in Washington D.C. Vol. Six (Andrew's, 1975)
 Collage (Andrew's, 1975)
 Marathon '75 Vol. 1 (Andrew's, 1976)
 Marathon '75 Vol. 2 (Andrew's, 1976)
 Marathon '75 Vol. 3 (Andrew's, 1976)
 Marathon '75 Vol. 4 (Andrew's, 1976)
 Marathon '75 Vol. 6 (Andrew's, 1976)
 Marathon '75 Vol. 7 (Andrew's, 1976)
 Marathon '75 Vol. 8 (Andrew's, 1976)
 Marathon '75 Vol. 9 (Andrew's, 1976)
 Red Top (Andrew's, 1977)
 Miss Ann (Andrew's, 1977)
 Countdown (Andrew's, 1977)
 Seven Giant Steps for Coltrane (Andrew's 1977)
 Ebony Glaze (Andrew's, 1977)
 Trinkle, Trinkle (Andrew's, 1977)
 Spotts, Maxine and Brown (Andrew's, 1977)
 Bionic Saxophone (Andrew's, 1978)
 Live in New York Vol. One (Andrew's, 1978)
 Live in New York Vol. Two (Andrew's, 1978)
 Saxophonitis (Andrew's, 1979)
 Fonk Update (Andrew's, 1981)
 Have Band Will Travel (Andrew's, 1981)
 I Love Japan (Andrew's, 1981)
 Profile (Andrew's, 1984)
 Gigtime 2000 Vol. 1 Nouveau Fonk (Andrew's, 1999)
 Gigtime 2000 Vol. 2 Andrew's Theme (Andrew's, 1999)
 Gigtime 2000 Vol. 3 Everybody Loves the Sugar (Andrew's, 1999)
 Gigtime 2000 Vol. 4 Keep On Dancin', Baby! (Andrew's, 1999)
 M M and M Series Vol. 2: Magical Genius (Andrew's, 2019)

As sideman
With Julius Hemphill
 Fat Man and the Hard Blues (Black Saint, 1991)
 Five Chord Stud (Black Saint, 1994)
 At Dr. King's Table (1997)
 The Hard Blues (Clean Feed, 2004)

With McCoy Tyner
 Asante (Blue Note, 1974)
 Cosmos (Blue Note, 1976)

With Weather Report
 I Sing the Body Electric (Columbia, 1972)
 Sweetnighter (Columbia, 1973)
 Forecast: Tomorrow (Columbia, 2006)

With others
 The 5th Dimension, Live!! (Bell, 1971)
 Beaver Harris, Beaver Is My Name (Timeless, 1987)
 Elvin Jones, Soul Train (Denon, 1980)
 Lloyd McNeill, Washington Suite (ASHA, 1970)
 Marion Williams, Standing Here Wondering Which Way to Go (Atlantic, 1971)

References

External links

American International Artists

1942 births
2020 deaths
American jazz saxophonists
American male saxophonists
American multi-instrumentalists
Musicians from Nashville, Tennessee
Musicians from Washington, D.C.
CIMP artists
21st-century American saxophonists
21st-century American male musicians
American male jazz musicians
20th-century American saxophonists